Henri Kontinen and Heather Watson defeated Robert Farah and Anna-Lena Grönefeld in the final, 7–6(7–5), 6–4 to win the mixed doubles tennis title at the 2016 Wimbledon Championships. Kontinen became the first Finn to win a major title, while Watson became the first British woman to win the title since Jo Durie in 1987.

Leander Paes and Martina Hingis were the defending champions, but lost in the third round to Kontinen and Watson.

Seeds
All seeds receive a bye into the second round.

Draw

Finals

Top half

Section 1

Section 2

Bottom half

Section 3

Section 4

References

External links
 Mixed Doubles Draw
2016 Wimbledon Championships – Doubles draws and results at the International Tennis Federation

X=Mixed Doubles
Wimbledon Championship by year – Mixed doubles